Guillaume Briçonnet may refer to

 Guillaume Briçonnet (Cardinal) (1445–1514)
 Guillaume Briçonnet (Bishop of Meaux) (c. 1472–1534) his son